Osvaldo Giroldo Júnior (born 22 February 1973), known as Juninho or Juninho Paulista, is a Brazilian former footballer who played as an attacking midfielder and is now the national team co-ordinator of the Brazil national football team. During his professional career, he played for Brazilian clubs São Paulo, Vasco da Gama, Palmeiras, Flamengo, as well as English club Middlesbrough, Spanish club Atlético Madrid, Celtic in Scotland and Sydney FC in Australia.

Juninho played 49 international matches for the Brazil national team from 1995 to 2003, winning the 2002 FIFA World Cup and the bronze medal at the 1996 Olympic tournament.

Club career
Born in São Paulo, Juninho played youth football for FC Curvados e Orgulhoso, a local club set up in São Paulo, and for Esporte Clube DER, an amateur team based in São Bernardo do Campo (SP), winning two youth municipal championship in a row, as well as futsal at Clube Atlético Juventus.

Ituano FC
Juninho began his senior career with Ituano FC, a team in Itu, São Paulo, in 1990. In 1993, during a Campeonato Paulista match against reigning champions São Paulo FC, Juninho scored and was voted man of the match as Ituano secured an unlikely victory. This grabbed the attention of São Paulo FC's head coach Telê Santana, who requested that his team buy the young talent. Juninho went on to be voted "Rookie of the Year" that season.

São Paulo FC
In 1993, Juninho was transferred to São Paulo FC, with whom he won a number of trophies, including the 1993 Intercontinental Cup against Italian team A.C. Milan and the 1994 Copa CONMEBOL. He made his debut for the Brazil national team ("Seleção") in February 1995, before moving abroad to play in Europe.

Middlesbrough
In October 1995, Juninho signed for English club Middlesbrough for £4.75 million, just months after they had been promoted to the English top-flight FA Premier League. Then aged 22, Juninho had been tracked by numerous European top clubs, and it was a major surprise when he signed for "the Teessiders". Juninho became known as TLF (The Little Fella) by Boro fans, after local radio broadcaster Dave Roberts nicknamed the player on his football talk show. The nickname alludes to his height: only . During his time with Middlesbrough, Juninho lived in Levendale and Ingleby Barwick with his parents. He was known for playing football with school children on the streets and is still considered one of the greatest players to have played for Middlesbrough in the modern era.

He made his debut on 4 November 1995 at home to Leeds United, setting up the opening goal for Jan Åge Fjørtoft in a 1–1 draw. Juninho proved extremely effective as an attacking midfielder, and his skills helped the club reach the final of both the FA Cup and League Cup in 1997, although they lost both. At the end of the 1997 season, a three-point deduction condemned Middlesbrough to relegation to the second division; following a 1–1 draw at Leeds United on the final day of the season which confirmed the club's relegation, Juninho was reduced to tears. Despite the club's relegation, Juninho came runner up to Gianfranco Zola for the FWA Player of the Year award. Ultimately, Juninho left Middlesbrough to pursue his chances of making Brazil's 1998 World Cup squad. Juninho scored 17 goals in 74 games during his first time at Middlesbrough.

Atlético Madrid
Juninho was sold to Atlético Madrid for £13m, and started out well for the team. However, his time at Atlético was hampered massively by injuries, and he never quite achieved the heights that were expected of him. On 1 February 1998, during a league match against Celta de Vigo, a tackle by opponent defender Míchel Salgado broke Juninho's fibula, sidelining the Brazilian for six months and thus making him miss the 1998 World Cup.

Juninho was loaned back to Middlesbrough (who by then had been promoted back to the Premier League) during the 1999–2000 season, and scored four goals in 24 games for the club, before returning to Atlético Madrid. Upon his return, Atlético had been relegated to the secondary Segunda División. Juninho was then loaned out to Brazilian team Vasco da Gama, where he played alongside another Juninho, Juninho Pernambucano; he then earned the demonym "Paulista" in order to be differentiated from his teammate. He won the 2000 domestic Campeonato Brasileiro Série A championship and the international Copa Mercosur trophy. He also had a brief loan spell with Flamengo.

Return to Middlesbrough
Juninho began his third spell with Middlesbrough in the summer of 2002, when he permanently left Atlético Madrid for £6m. He spent two years back at Middlesbrough's Riverside Stadium, and helped the club win the 2003–04 Football League Cup, the team's first and so far only major honour. In December 2007 he was voted by Boro fans in a PFA fan's poll as Middlesbrough's greatest ever player. Juninho is still seen as a hero on Teesside by many Middlesbrough fans – soon after he joined Middlesbrough in 1995 Boro fans would put out both their arms and bow forwards in worship during matches, this continued even through to his third spell at the club. Juninho said he would love a fourth spell at the Boro to end his career, however no such opportunity materialised. Ultimately, although he did have a higher goals-to-games ratio during this period than in either of his previous two spells at the club, Juninho never fully recaptured his mesmerising form of the 1996–97 season and never fully recovered from the broken leg he suffered during his time at Atlético Madrid. Nonetheless he remained a legend on Teesside and maintains an iconic status to this day.

Celtic
At the end of the 2004 season, Juninho moved to Scottish club Celtic on a free transfer, making his debut in an Old Firm derby against Celtic's rivals Rangers, which Celtic won 1–0. Juninho struggled to break into the first team during his time with Celtic, and complained that manager Martin O'Neill didn't play him enough. Instead of playing in his usual position in the middle of the pitch, Juninho was often deployed on the right by O'Neill, due to the presence of already established Celtic midfielders Stiliyan Petrov and Neil Lennon. Juninho scored only once in his spell at Celtic, in a 3–0 win over Hearts in October 2004.

Brazilian return
Juninho returned to Brazil in 2005, to play for Palmeiras. He moved back to his former team Flamengo in 2007 for the Carioca Championship and the Copa Libertadores, but never won the trust of coach Ney Franco, playing only about half of the games. In May that year, Juninho was sacked after arguing with and insulting Franco after refusing to be substituted at half-time during a disappointing 3–0 quarter-final defeat at Uruguayan side Defensor Sporting in the Copa Libertadores.

Sydney FC
Although clubs in Brazil, Qatar, and Hong Kong were reportedly keen on signing Juninho, he opted to join Sydney FC in the A-League as the club's marquee player, signing on 1 August 2007, stating that the interest the club showed towards him made a strong contribution to the decision. Due to a shoulder injury early in the season, Juninho spent large periods on the bench and his on-field performances were hampered by chronic pain, aggressive play, and secondary injuries, requiring painkillers and cortisone before each match. Despite this, he managed several strong showings including a masterful performance in Sydney's 5–3 victory over LA Galaxy.

Sydney's strong signings, which used a large amount of their salary cap, made a new contract look unlikely. A number of A-League clubs including Perth Glory, Gold Coast United, and Adelaide United expressed their desire to sign Juninho. Following the signing of a new marquee player and other players, including Australian international John Aloisi, Sydney FC declined to offer Juninho a new contract. He was released in the off-season in April 2008. Juninho later announced his retirement from professional football.

Return to playing
In January 2010, Juninho returned to the game as player-president of Brazilian club Ituano, and on the last day of the season, with his impending retirement, he scored the goal that saved them from relegation. He also returned to Middlesbrough where he featured in his own testimonial in which PSV Eindhoven defeated Middlesbrough 3–2.

Career statistics

Club

International 
Appearances and goals by national team and year

Honours
São Paulo
Supercopa Libertadores: 1993
Intercontinental Cup: 1993
Recopa Sudamericana: 1993, 1994
Copa CONMEBOL: 1994

Vasco da Gama
Série A: 2000
Copa Mercosur: 2000

Middlesbrough
Football League Cup: 2003–04

Flamengo
Campeonato Carioca: 2007
Brazil
FIFA World Cup: 2002
FIFA Confederations Cup: 1997

Individual
Premier League Player of the Month: March 1997
Premier League Player of the Season: 1996–97
Middlesbrough Player of the Year: 1996–97
North-East FWA Player of the Year: 1997
Bola de Prata: 2000, 2005
South American Team of the Year: 2000, 2001

References
Notes

Citations

Sources

External links
 
 
 Premier League Profile

1973 births
Living people
Footballers from São Paulo
Brazilian footballers
Association football midfielders
São Paulo FC players
Middlesbrough F.C. players
Atlético Madrid footballers
CR Vasco da Gama players
CR Flamengo footballers
Celtic F.C. players
Sociedade Esportiva Palmeiras players
Sydney FC players
Ituano FC players
Campeonato Brasileiro Série A players
Premier League players
La Liga players
Scottish Premier League players
A-League Men players
Marquee players (A-League Men)
Olympic footballers of Brazil
Brazil international footballers
1995 Copa América players
Footballers at the 1996 Summer Olympics
1997 FIFA Confederations Cup players
2001 Copa América players
2002 FIFA World Cup players
Olympic medalists in football
Olympic bronze medalists for Brazil
Medalists at the 1996 Summer Olympics
Copa Libertadores-winning players
FIFA Confederations Cup-winning players
FIFA World Cup-winning players
Brazilian expatriate footballers
Brazilian expatriate sportspeople in England
Brazilian expatriate sportspeople in Spain
Brazilian expatriate sportspeople in Scotland
Brazilian expatriate sportspeople in Australia
Expatriate footballers in England
Expatriate footballers in Spain
Expatriate footballers in Scotland
Expatriate soccer players in Australia
FA Cup Final players